Ingush may refer to:

 Ingush language, Northeast Caucasian language
 Ingush people, an ethnic group of the North Caucasus

See also
Ingushetia (disambiguation)

Language and nationality disambiguation pages